Rhizocarpon furax is a species of lichen in the family Rhizocarpaceae. It is found in Europe, where it has a scattered distribution.

Rhizocarpon furax is a lichenicolous fungi, meaning that it grows on the thallus of other lichens. It was originally reported from Lecidea swartzioidea but has since been reported growing on Lecidea lapicida and Tremolecia atrata.

See also
 List of Lecidea species

References

Rhizocarpaceae
Lichen species
Lichens described in 1970
Taxa named by Josef Poelt